Renewal theory is the branch of probability theory that generalizes the Poisson process for arbitrary holding times. Instead of exponentially distributed holding times, a renewal process may have any independent and identically distributed (IID) holding times that have finite mean. A renewal-reward process additionally has a random sequence of rewards incurred at each holding time, which are IID but need not be independent of the holding times.

A renewal process has asymptotic properties analogous to the strong law of large numbers and central limit theorem. The renewal function  (expected number of arrivals) and reward function  (expected reward value) are of key importance in renewal theory. The renewal function satisfies a recursive integral equation, the renewal equation. The superposition of renewal processes can be studied as a special case of Markov renewal processes.

Applications include calculating the best strategy for replacing worn-out machinery in a factory and comparing the long-term benefits of different insurance policies. The inspection paradox relates to the fact that observing a renewal interval at time t gives an interval with average value larger than that of an average renewal interval.

Renewal processes

Introduction
The renewal process is a generalization of the Poisson process. In essence, the Poisson process is a continuous-time Markov process on the positive integers (usually starting at zero) which has independent exponentially distributed holding times at each integer  before advancing to the next integer, . In a renewal process, the holding times need not have an exponential distribution; rather, the holding times may have any distribution on the positive numbers, so long as the holding times are independent and identically distributed (IID) and have finite mean.

Formal definition

Let  be a sequence of positive independent identically distributed random variables such that

We refer to the random variable  as the "-th holding time".

Define for each n > 0 :

each  is referred to as the "-th jump time" and the intervals  are called "renewal intervals".

Then  is given by random variable

where  is the indicator function

 represents the number of jumps that have occurred by time t, and is called a renewal process.

Interpretation
If one considers events occurring at random times, one may choose to think of the holding times  as the random time elapsed between two consecutive events. For example, if the renewal process is modelling the numbers of breakdown of different machines, then the holding time represents the time between one machine breaking down before another one does.

The Poisson process is the unique renewal process with the Markov property, as the exponential distribution is the unique continuous random variable with the property of memorylessness.

Renewal-reward processes

Let  be a sequence of IID random variables (rewards) satisfying

Then the random variable

is called a renewal-reward process.

The random variable  depends on two sequences: the holding times  and the rewards
 These two sequences need not be independent. In particular,  may be a function

Interpretation
In the context of the above interpretation of the holding times as the time between successive malfunctions of a machine, the "rewards"  (which in this case happen to be negative) may be viewed as the successive repair costs incurred as a result of the successive malfunctions.

Sometimes it lays golden eggs of random weight, and sometimes it lays toxic eggs (also of random weight) which require responsible (and costly) disposal. The "rewards"  are the successive (random) financial losses/gains resulting from successive eggs (i = 1,2,3,...) and  records the total financial "reward" at time t.

Renewal function
We define the renewal function as the expected value of the number of jumps observed up to some time :

Elementary renewal theorem
The renewal function satisfies

{| class="toccolours collapsible collapsed" width="80%" style="text-align:left"
!Proof
|-
|The  strong law of large numbers for renewal processes implies

To prove the elementary renewal theorem, it is sufficient to show that  is uniformly integrable.

To do this, consider some truncated renewal process where the holding times are defined by  where  is a point such that  which exists for all non-deterministic renewal processes. Furthermore, the number of renewals at each time is geometric with parameter . So we have

|}

Elementary renewal theorem for renewal reward processes
We define the reward function:

The reward function satisfies

Renewal equation
The renewal function satisfies

{| class="toccolours collapsible collapsed" width="80%" style="text-align:left"
!Proof
|-
|We may iterate the expectation about the first holding time:

From the definition of the renewal process, we have

So

as required.
|}

Key renewal theorem
Let X be a renewal process with renewal function  and interrenewal mean . Let  be a function satisfying:
 
 g is monotone and non-increasing

The key renewal theorem states that, as :

Renewal theorem
Considering  for any  gives as a special case the renewal theorem:
 as 

The result can be proved using integral equations or by a coupling argument. Though a special case of the key renewal theorem, it can be used to deduce the full theorem, by considering step functions and then increasing sequences of step functions.

Asymptotic properties
Renewal processes and renewal-reward processes have properties analogous to the strong law of large numbers, which can be derived from the same theorem.

almost surely.

{| class="toccolours collapsible collapsed" width="80%" style="text-align:left"
!Proof
|-
|First consider . By definition we have:

for all  and so

for all t ≥ 0.

Now since  we have:

as  almost surely (with probability 1). Hence:

almost surely (using the strong law of large numbers); similarly:

almost surely.

Thus (since  is sandwiched between the two terms)

almost surely.

Next consider . We have

almost surely (using the first result and using the law of large numbers on ).
|}

Renewal processes additionally have a property analogous to the central limit theorem:

Inspection paradox

A curious feature of renewal processes is that if we wait some predetermined time t and then observe how large the renewal interval containing t is, we should expect it to be typically larger than a renewal interval of average size. 

Mathematically the inspection paradox states: for any t > 0 the renewal interval containing t is stochastically larger than the first renewal interval. That is, for all x > 0 and for all t > 0:

where FS is the cumulative distribution function of the IID holding times Si. A vivid example is the bus waiting time paradox: For a given random distribution of bus arrivals, the average rider at a bus stop observes more delays than the average operator of the buses.

The resolution of the paradox is that our sampled distribution at time t is size-biased (see sampling bias), in that the likelihood an interval is chosen is proportional to its size. However, a renewal interval of average size is not size-biased.

{| class="toccolours collapsible collapsed" width="80%" style="text-align:left"
!Proof
|-
Then

|}

Superposition
Unless the renewal process is a Poisson process, the superposition (sum) of two independent renewal processes is not a renewal process. However, such processes can be described within a larger class of processes called the Markov-renewal processes. However, the cumulative distribution function of the first inter-event time in the superposition process is given by

where Rk(t) and αk > 0 are the CDF of the inter-event times and the arrival rate of process k.

Example application
Eric the entrepreneur has n machines, each having an operational lifetime uniformly distributed between zero and two years. Eric may let each machine run until it fails with replacement cost €2600; alternatively he may replace a machine at any time while it is still functional at a cost of €200.

What is his optimal replacement policy?

{| class="toccolours collapsible collapsed" width="80%" style="text-align:left"
!Solution
|-
|The lifetime of the n machines can be modeled as n independent concurrent renewal-reward processes, so it is sufficient to consider the case n=1. The successive lifetimes S of the replacement machines are independent and identically distributed, so the optimal policy is the same for all replacement machines in the process.

If Eric decides at the start of a machine's life to replace it at time 0 < t < 2 but the machine happens to fail before that time then the lifetime S of the machine is uniformly distributed on [0, t] and thus has expectation 0.5t. So the overall expected lifetime of the machine is:

and the expected cost W per machine is:

So by the strong law of large numbers, his long-term average cost per unit time is:

then differentiating with respect to t:

this implies that the turning points satisfy:

and thus

We take the only solution t in [0, 2]: t = 2/3. This is indeed a minimum (and not a maximum) since the cost per unit time tends to infinity as t tends to zero, meaning that the cost is decreasing as t increases, until the point 2/3 where it starts to increase.
|}

See also

Campbell's theorem (probability)
Compound Poisson process
Continuous-time Markov process
Little's lemma
Lotka's integral equation
Palm–Khintchine theorem
Poisson process
Queueing theory
Residual time
Ruin theory
Semi-Markov process

Notes

References

Point processes